Andrei Voronkov may refer to:
Andrei Voronkov (born 1959), Russian computer scientist
Andrei Voronkov (volleyball) (born 1967), Russian volleyball coach and former player
Andrey Varankow (born 1989), Belarusian football forward